IBM System - is a common name for IBM products.

Digit-named series

Hardware
IBM Personal System/1
IBM Personal System/note
IBM Personal System/2
IBM Personal System/2 note
IBM Personal System/2 laptop
IBM System/3
IBM System/4 Pi
IBM Office System/6
IBM System/7
IBM System/23
IBM System/32
IBM System/34
IBM System/36
IBM System/38
IBM Personal System/55
IBM Personal System/55 note
IBM System/88

IBM System/360
IBM System/370
IBM System/390
IBM System/390 Multiprise
IBM Advanced System/400

IBM System Cluster 1350
IBM 1800 Data Acquisition and Control System
IBM 3850 Mass Storage System
IBM 5520 Administrative System
IBM RISC System/6000
IBM 7700 Data Acquisition System
IBM 8100 Information System
IBM System 9000
IBM Enterprise System/9000

Software
IBM Operating System/2
IBM Business System 12
System/360 OS:
IBM Basic Operating System/360
IBM System/360 Operating System
IBM Time Sharing System/360
DOS versions:
IBM Disk Operating System/360
IBM Tape Operating System/360
IBM 1401 Symbolic Programming System

Letter-named series

Hardware
IBM System i
IBM System i5
IBM System p
IBM System p5
IBM System x
IBM System z
IBM System z9
IBM System z10

Software
IBM System R
IBM SystemT

Word-named series

Hardware
Models and lines:
IBM Displaywriter System
IBM FlashSystem
IBM Flex System
IBM Power Systems
IBM Personal System/ValuePoint
IBM Personal System/V
IBM System Storage
IBM Q System One
IBM XIV Storage System
IBM zEnterprise System

Technologies:
IBM Standard Modular System

Software
IBM Administrative Terminal System
IBM Cross System Product
IBM Group Control System
IBM Information Management System
IBM Internet Security Systems
IBM Programming Language/Systems
IBM Structured Query Language/Data System
IBM Systems Application Architecture
IBM Systems Network Architecture
IBM System Object Model
IBM System Support Program
IBM PowerHA SystemMirror
File systems:
IBM Journaled File System
IBM SAN File System

See also
IBM Series/1
IBM Future Systems project
System request button
IBM platform (disambiguation)
List of IBM products (Operating systems)